A milieu is a social environment. 

Milieu may also refer to:

 , a common term for Organized crime in France
 Milieu River (Normandin River), a tributary of Poutrincourt Lake, Lac-Ashuapmushuan, Quebec, Canada
 Mont de Milieu, a Premier cru vineyard in Chablis, France

See also
 Milieu control, a term to describe tactics that control environment and human communication through the use of social pressure and group language
 Milieu intérieur, in biology, the extra-cellular fluid environment
 Milieu therapy, a form of psychotherapy that involves the use of therapeutic communities